Ariel Martínez may refer to:
 Ariel Martínez (Cuban footballer)
 Ariel Martínez (Chilean footballer)
 Ariel Martínez (baseball)